Smail Morabit (born 5 July 1988) is a French footballer who plays for French amateur side SSEP Hombourg-Haut.

Career
Born in Forbach, Morabit began his career with Union Sportive Forbach and signed in summer 2007 for German club SF Köllerbach. After one season with SF Köllerbach, in which he scored 7 goals in 26 matches, Morabit signed a two-year contract with Eintracht Braunschweig on 21 August 2008. After two years, he left Eintracht Braunschweig on 30 June 2010. Morabit then signed a contract with CS Fola Esch of the Luxembourg National Division. However, after only one week and without playing any matches for Fola Esch, Morabit terminated his contract. As his reason, he later stated to have been disappointed by the lack of professionalism in football in Luxembourg.

Ahead of the 2019–20 season, Morabit joined French club US Sarre-Union. He left for SSEP Hombourgh-Haut, newly promoted to Régional 2 (tier 7) in the summer of 2020.

Career statistics

References

External links
 
 

1988 births
Living people
People from Forbach
French footballers
French expatriate footballers
French sportspeople of Moroccan descent
Eintracht Braunschweig players
Eintracht Braunschweig II players
CS Fola Esch players
FC Rot-Weiß Erfurt players
VfL Bochum players
VfL Bochum II players
1. FC Heidenheim players
FSV Frankfurt players
SV Elversberg players
US Sarre-Union players
2. Bundesliga players
3. Liga players
Championnat National 3 players
French expatriate sportspeople in Germany
Association football forwards
Expatriate footballers in Luxembourg
Expatriate footballers in Germany
Sportspeople from Moselle (department)
Footballers from Grand Est